Sam Oscar Lantinga is a computer programmer. He used to be the lead software engineer at Blizzard Entertainment, where he was known to the community as Slouken. He is best known as the creator of the Simple DirectMedia Layer, a very popular open source multimedia programming library, and also developed the compatibility database for Executor, a proprietary Mac OS emulator.

He was the lead programmer and a co-founder of the now-defunct Loki Software, which ported several game titles to Linux. A Linux client of World of Warcraft was developed, and negotiations with Linux Game Publishing were under way until Blizzard cancelled the project. It is unknown if Lantinga was involved with this port.

He also founded Galaxy Gameworks in 2008 to help commercially support the Simple DirectMedia Layer. He left Blizzard Entertainment to "relax, spend time with family, and explore some ideas to expand the Galaxy Gameworks business." Soon after he launched a new website for Gameworks including an extensive list of developer testimonials. Lantinga went on to work for 38 Studios, which shut down in May 2012. Lantinga is currently employed at Valve.

Games credited 
The following is a list of game products Lantinga either developed on or was involved in porting.

Blizzard Entertainment 
 Hearthstone
 World of Warcraft
 Warcraft III: Reign of Chaos

Loki Software 
 Kohan: Immortal Sovereigns
 Tribes 2
 MindRover
 Sid Meier's Alpha Centauri
 Rune
 Rune: Halls of Valhalla
 Heavy Gear II
 Heretic II
 Heroes of Might and Magic III
 Railroad Tycoon II
 Civilization: Call To Power

Ambrosia Software
 Maelstrom

References

External links 
 Sam Lantinga's Homepage (archived 2008-05-22)
 Homepage for SDL, Sam's cross-platform open source game library
 Sam Lantinga at Wowpedia
 Sam Lantinga Slings Some Answers (2001 interview)
 The Sam Lantinga interview - November 11th, 1999 (Linux.com)

Living people
Video game programmers
Free software programmers
Linux game porters
Blizzard Entertainment people
Valve Corporation people
University of California, Davis alumni
Year of birth missing (living people)